Hypericum maguirei is a species of shrub in the family Hypericaceae. It is endemic to Ecuador, where it grows in the páramo of the Andes. It occurs at elevations between 2000 and 4000 meters.

References

maguirei
Endemic flora of Ecuador
Páramo flora
Taxonomy articles created by Polbot